Corinna S. Schindler is a Professor of Chemistry at the University of Michigan. She develops catalytic reactions with environmentally benign metals such as iron, towards the synthesis of biologically active small molecules. For her research in the development of new catalysts, Schindler has been honored with several early-career researcher awards including the David and Lucile Packard Foundation Fellowship in 2016, the Alfred P. Sloan Fellowship in 2017, and being named a member of the C&EN Talented 12 in 2017. Schindler has served on the Editorial Board of Organic and Bimolecular Chemistry since 2018.

Early life and education

Schindler was born and raised in Schwäbisch Hall, Germany. She did her undergraduate work at the Technical University of Munich, where she worked on organometallic chemistry. She completed her Diploma Thesis (equivalent of a Master of Science) in 2004 under the direction of K. C. Nicolaou at the Scripps Research Institute in La Jolla, California. In Nicolaou's group, Schindler worked on the total synthesis of the natural products marinomycins A-C.

Schindler earned her doctorate degree in 2010 at the ETH Zurich under the direction of Erick M. Carreira. Her PhD thesis focused on the development of new synthetic strategies to access the aeruginosin class of natural products, centered on the opening of oxabicyclic ring systems.

After completing her doctorate degree, Schindler joined Eric N. Jacobsen's research group at Harvard University as a Feodor Lynen Postdoctoral Fellow. In Jacobsen's group, she developed enantioselective aza-Sakurai reactions and photoredox catalysis for amine oxidations.

Schindler began her independent career in 2013 at the University of Michigan as an Assistant Professor. She was promoted to Associate Professor (and granted tenure) in 2019.

Research interests

Schindler's research group includes an international team of researchers working in the area of organic chemistry with an emphasis on the synthesis of molecules of biological importance.  Key areas of interest include the development of new synthetic routes for molecules that are potentially important in the areas of material science and medicine. Schindler's research group also focuses on the synthesis of biologically active natural products such as the platelet aggregation and influenza virus replication inhibiting herqulines B and C.

Her laboratory recently reported a carbonyl-olefin ring closure metathesis reaction using an environmentally benign iron catalyst, iron(III) chloride, that could replace widely-used precious metal catalysts, which are expensive and can be harmful to the environment.

Awards and honors 
For her contributions to science, Schindler has been the recipient of many research and recognition awards.  These include:

 Feodor-Lynen Fellowship Alexander von Humboldt Foundation (2010)
 ETH Medal (2011)
 NSF Career Award (2016)
 Camille Dreyfus Teacher-Scholar Award (2018)
 C&E News Talented Twelve (2017)
 Alfred P. Sloan Foundation Fellow (2107)
 ACS Award in Pure Chemistry (2020)

Publications

References

Year of birth missing (living people)
Living people
Technical University of Munich alumni
ETH Zurich alumni
University of Michigan faculty
German expatriates in Switzerland